The Norris Staples House is a house located in Astoria, Oregon, listed on the National Register of Historic Places.

See also
 National Register of Historic Places listings in Clatsop County, Oregon

References

1910 establishments in Oregon
Houses completed in 1910
Houses on the National Register of Historic Places in Astoria, Oregon
Individually listed contributing properties to historic districts on the National Register in Oregon
Bungalow architecture in Oregon